The IFSC Climbing Asian Cup is a series of Asian climbing competitions organized by the International Federation of Sport Climbing (IFSC).

Asian Cups

Men's results

Lead

Speed

Bouldering

Women's results

Lead

Speed

Bouldering

References

External links 
 Calendar of IFSC competitions

Climbing competitions